Dr. Randall Caroline Forsberg ( – ) led a lifetime of research and advocacy on ways to reduce the risk of war, minimize the burden of military spending, and promote democratic institutions.  Her career started at the Stockholm International Peace Research Institute in 1968. In 1974 she moved to Cambridge, Massachusetts (where she earned her Ph.D. in 1980) to found the Institute for Defense and Disarmament Studies (IDDS) as well as to launch the national Nuclear Weapons Freeze Campaign. Randall Forsberg was accompanied by an important colleague by the name of Helen Caldicott while she was leading the Nuclear freeze movement in both Manhattan and Central Park. Both women were met with many challenges in their efforts to lead the Nuclear Freeze Movement. These challenges included gender discrimination and discreditation as influential leaders by the media. Forsberg's strong leadership in the nuclear freeze movement is thought to be very influential in the writing of foreign policy during the Reagan administration and is even credited with catalyzing the negotiation of the INF treaty between President Reagan and Mikhail Gorbachev.

Background
Randall Forsberg (née Watson, 1943–2007) was born in Huntsville, Alabama. Randall, often referred to as "Randy" is the daughter of Douglass Watson She graduated from Columbia University in 1965 and later moved to Pennsylvania where she taught English and married her husband Gunnar Forsberg and moved to Stockholm in 1967. The couple later divorced. It is here that she became interested in arms control issues while working at the Stockholm International Peace Research Institute as a typist in the late 1960s and early 1970s. In 1974, she returned to the United States, and became a graduate student in defense Studies in the Department of Political Science at Massachusetts Institute of Technology. After earning her Ph. D. in 1980 she founded the Institute for Defense and Disarmament Studies (IDDS). The IDDS is a "non-profit center that studies global military policies, arms holdings, production and trade." As director of the IDDS, Forsberg was responsible for publishing the Arms Control Reporter monthly and IDDS Almanac: World Arms Holdings, Production, and Trade once a year. In December 1979, Forsberg gave a speech in Louisville at the annual meeting of Mobilization for Survival, an anti-nuclear organization. It is this speech that gained Forsberg momentum for her anti-nuclear campaign and led her to publish Call to Halt the Arms Race in 1979. This publication was the manifesto of the Nuclear Weapons Freeze Campaign. The four-paged document advocated a bilateral halt to the testing, production, deployment and delivery of nuclear weapons. By 1982, Forsberg's nuclear freeze campaign had gained support from various state and county governments, over 100 national organizations, numerous large labor unions, and many other organizations. Support for Forsberg's grassroots movement was very evident in 1982 when the freeze resolutions appeared on ballots in nine states. The polls showed that 10.8 million out of 18 million US citizens voted in favor of the freeze. On June 12 of the same year, approximately one million people gathered in Central Park to show their support for a Nuclear Freeze at anti-nuclear weapon rally. In 1983, after receiving the MacArthur Foundation grant, Randall became president of a group known as Freeze Voter. This group organized and collected large amounts of money in an effort to endorse candidates in the 1984 who were for nuclear disarmament.

Forsberg was awarded a doctorate in 1980 and she started the Institute for Defense and Disarmament Studies, which became an important resource for the peace movement and anti-nuclear weapons movement. In 1983 Forsberg was awarded a $204,000 MacArthur Foundation genius grant for showing unique artistic, intellectual or social creativity. In 2005 she became Anne and Bernard Spitzer Chair  in Political Science and International Security Studies at the City College of New York. To add to her long list of achievement, Forsberg also served as a board member for the Arms Control Association. Dr. Forsberg died of cancer on October 19, 2007 at the age of 64. She is survived by her daughter, Katarina Forsberg.

Campaigns
2002 Write-In candidate for Senate, Massachusetts.
1980 launched the national Nuclear Weapons Freeze Campaign.

Government service
1995 appointed by President Clinton to Advisory Committee of US Arms Control and Disarmament Agency.
1989 briefed President Bush and his Cabinet officials on US-Soviet arms control issues.
Served on panels for the US Congressional Research Service, the US General Accounting Office, and the US Office of Technology Assessment;
Testified before US Congress
Testified before Swedish Parliament
three visits to Seoul, South Korea, in 2001 to participate in panels on North-South Korean reconciliation and arms reductions—two at the invitation of the South Korean military, and one at the invitation of South Korean peace activists.
Served on Advisory Panel for the U.S. Office of Technology Assessment

Talks at West Point, the US Air Force Academy, the National Defense University, and the German War College; and met with senior government officials of Russia, China, Germany, Norway, and other countries. She was on the board or advisory board of the Boston Review, Arms Control Association, Journal of Peace Research, University of California Institute for Global Cooperation and Conflict, and Women's Action for New Directions from  until her death in 2007.

Awards
1989 Pomerance Award
1983 MacArthur Foundation Fellowship [often called the "genius" award]

Education
B.A. Columbia University
Ph.D. Political Science: Defense Policy; Massachusetts Institute of Technology

Publications

Journals
IDDS Database of World Arms Holdings, Production, and Trade. (annual)
Arms Control Reporter, Institute for Defense and Disarmament Studies (monthly since 1982)

Articles
"Citizens and Arms Control", Boston Review, October/November 2002 http://bostonreview.net/BR27.5/forsberg.html
Randall Forsberg and Jonathan Cohen make it clear that the U.S. has no nation-state enemies left who could mount a sustained threat to our national security; see "Issues and Choices in Arms Production and Trade," in Randall Forsberg, editor, THE ARMS PRODUCTION DILEMMA (Cambridge, Massachusetts: MIT Press, 1994), pgs. 269–290.
the Call to Halt the Nuclear Arms Race, the manifesto of the Nuclear Weapons Freeze Campaign, and she helped found and lead the campaign. 1980
 "Randall Forsberg discusses her work and the current international situation", Peace Magazine, Aug-Sep 1989.   http://archive.peacemagazine.org/v05n4p10.htm

As well as articles in Scientific American, International Security, Technology Review, Bulletin of the Atomic Scientists, and World Policy Journal.

Books
Abolishing War: Culture and Institutions (with Elise Boulding, brc21.org: 1998).
Nonproliferation Primer (with William Driscoll, Gregory Webb and Jonathan Dean) MIT Press April 1995 168 pp., 15 illus. https://web.archive.org/web/20060916200420/http://mitpress.mit.edu/catalog/item/default.asp?ttype=2&tid=7575
The Arms Production Dilemma: Contraction and Restraint in the World Combat Aircraft Industry (MIT Press November 1994)320 pp. https://web.archive.org/web/20060911014737/http://mitpress.mit.edu/catalog/item/default.asp?ttype=2&tid=4556
Cutting Conventional Forces (1DDS: 1989)
Peace Resource Book (Lexiston Books: 1985)
The Price of Defense (NYTimes: 1979)
Resources Devoted to Military Research and Development: An International Comparison (SIPRI: 1972)
Towards a Theory of Peace: The Role of Moral Beliefs (with Matthew Evangelista and Neta Crawford) Cornell Global Perspectives: 2019
Arms Control in the New Era: Linked Restraints on Arms Deployment, Production, and Trade (MIT Press: 1995)

See also
 List of peace activists

Notes

External links
Obituary in The Times, 7 November 2007
Interview about the arms race and interview about the Nuclear Freeze Movement for the WGBH series, War and Peace in the Nuclear Age
Obituary

Arms control people
Barnard College alumni
MIT School of Humanities, Arts, and Social Sciences alumni
MacArthur Fellows
1943 births
2007 deaths
American anti–nuclear weapons activists